Hannah Robinson (born in Derbyshire) is a British songwriter. Her best-known compositions include Rachel Stevens's UK No. 2 hit "Some Girls", Ladyhawke's "My Delirium" and Annie's "Chewing Gum". Robinson began her career as a vocalist and in 2006 she achieved a No. 1 on the US Hot Dance Club Play chart with "Give Me Your Love", a collaboration with Carl Cox.

Career 

Robinson began her career, having no formal music or vocal training, by responding to adverts for session singers in the British music papers the New Musical Express and Melody Maker. After an initial struggle she began securing backing vocal work firstly in Italy and then in London where she began working with different producers and increasingly established artists. This career path eventually led to Robinson meeting her manager and then securing a publishing deal.

Discography 
List of songs written or co-written by Hannah Robinson:

See also
List of Billboard number-one dance club songs
List of artists who reached number one on the U.S. Dance Club Songs chart

References

Discography from Hannah Robinson's official website
Discography from Discogs
Discography from Swedishcharts
Discography from Hannah Robinson's management, This Much Talent

External links
 
Hannah Robinson's management, This Much Talent
Interview, HitQuarters December 2009

British songwriters
Living people
Year of birth missing (living people)